English drum and bass duo Sigma have released one studio album, four extended plays and 12 singles. The duo signed to 3 Beat Records in the summer of 2013. They released their debut single "Summer Calling" with 3Beat featuring vocals from Taylor Fowlis. Their second single "Rudeboy" featuring Doctor was released in December 2013. The song peaked at number 56 on the UK Singles Chart.

Life, Sigma's debut studio album, was released on 4 December 2015. They released the single "Nobody to Love" (a rework of Kanye West's "Bound 2") on 6 April 2014 as the lead single from the album. The song peaked to number one on the UK Singles Chart. In July 2014, Sigma released the single "Changing" featuring vocals from Paloma Faith as the second single from the album. The song became their second consecutive number one single in the UK. "Higher" featuring vocals from Labrinth was released as the third single from the album. The song premiered on Annie Mac's Radio 1 show on 16 January 2015 and peaked to number 12 on the UK Singles Chart. On 24 July 2015, "Glitterball" featuring vocals from Ella Henderson was the fourth single from their debut studio album.

Studio albums

Extended plays

Singles

As lead artist

Promotional singles

Other appearances

Productions

Remixes

Notes

References

Discographies of British artists